Cho Nam-joo (born in 1978) is a Korean writer and author. She is best known for her 2016 novel Kim Ji-young, Born 1982, which has sold more than a million copies and is often credited with propelling a feminist movement in South Korea.

Personal life 
Nam-joo was born in South Korea in 1978. She grew up in Bucheon and moved to Seoul with her family at the age of five. During her mother's pregnancy with Cho, her father promised her uncle—who had five daughters—that if the baby was born a boy, he would gift the child to the uncle to raise. Ultimately, she was raised by her own parents.

As a child, Nam-joo loved reading, but she didn't have money for books, and her local public libraries in the poor outskirts of Seoul where she lived were barely functioning. She borrowed the few books she could and reread those stories again and again.

Nam-joo attended all-girls' school for middle school, high school, and college. She graduated from Ewha Womans University with a sociology degree. Nam-joo currently lives in Seoul with her family.

Career 
Nam-joo began her career in television as scriptwriter. She spent nearly a decade as a writer for TV programs about current events at a broadcasting station. She left work to raise her child, then returned as a writer. She published two novels before her hit book, Kim Ji-Young, Born 1982 was published in 2016. By 2023, she has published or signed for 10 books.

Kim Ji-Young, Born 1982 
Nam-joo published her third novel, Kim Ji-Young, Born 1982, in 2016. Originally written in Korean, it has been translated into more than 18 languages and sold more than one million copies.

Its publication in 2016 coincided with South Korea's very own #MeToo Movement, prompting a feminist reckoning and an urgent nationwide debate about gender inequality. The book is considered not just a novel but also cultural "reportage" and a "social treatise."

The slim novel is intended to portray an average Korean woman from childhood and through career and motherhood—the name Kim Ji-Young is the Korean equivalent of Jane Smith. It is the story of a 33-year-old stay-at-home mother who is driven to a psychotic break by misogyny and expectations on motherhood in Korean culture. The book is filled with footnoted statistics that reveal real gender inequalities steeped in South Korean.

Cho wrote the novel in 2015 within a span of just three months. The book is inspired by her own life and experiences—after a decade of working, she left her career to raise her child for a period, then found it difficult to reenter the workforce. So, she used this time to leverage her sociology degree and began collecting articles and sociological data to inform her book.

A film adaptation of Kim Ji-Young, Born 1982, featuring actress Jung Yu-mi in the titular role, was released in Korea in 2019 to critical acclaim.

References 

Korean women writers
1978 births
Living people
Ewha Womans University alumni